Enel Americas is a conglomerate of electric energy companies operating in South America and Central America countries: Argentina, Brazil, Colombia, Peru, Costa Rica, Panama and Guatemala. Through its affiliates it generates, transmits and distributes electric power.

Enel Américas is one of the largest private companies in Latin America, totaling 15,965 MW of installed capacity and delivering energy to more than 26.3 million customers, as of March 2022. 

Its controlling shareholder is the Italian company Enel S.p.A., a global energy company and one of the largest integrated operators in the energy in the world.

In December 2020, Enel Americas achieved for the first time the highest recognition of a Chilean-based company in terms of ESG - the ALAS 20 - with the best Company in Chile. In January 2020, the Company achieved the bronze medal at the S&P (Robecco SAM) Global Utilities Sustainability Yearbook 2020.

History

On June 19, 1981, Compañía Chilena de Electricidad S.A. was reorganized into a parent company and three subsidiaries. One of these was Compañía Chilena Metropolitana de Distribución Eléctrica S.A. In 1985, under the Chilean government's privatization policy, the process of transferring the share capital of Compañía Chilena Metropolitana de Distribución Eléctrica S.A. to the private sector was begun, ending finally on August 10, 1987.

In this process, the pension fund management companies (AFPs), company employees, institutional investors, and thousands of small shareholders joined the company. Its organizational structure was based on activities or operative functions whose results were evaluated functionally and its profitability was limited by a tariff structure as a result of the company's exclusive dedication to the electricity distribution business.

Restructuring and diversification (1987–2014) 
In 1987, the company's board proposed forming a division for each of the parent company's activities. Four subsidiaries were therefore created to be managed as business units each with its own objectives, thus expanding the company's activities toward other non-regulated activities but linked to the main business. This division was approved by the extraordinary shareholders meeting of November 25, 1987, which defined its new corporate objects. Compañía Chilena Metropolitana de Distribución Eléctrica S.A. thus became an investment holding company.

On August 1, 1988, by virtue of that agreed at the General Extraordinary Shareholder's Meeting of April 12, 1988, one of the corporations born out of the division changed its company name to Enersis S.A. The same year, and with the purpose of successfully facing the challenge of development and growth, the company was divided into five business units, which gave rise to five affiliates.

Of these, Chilectra and Río Maipo took charge of electric power distribution; Manso de Velasco concentrated upon engineering and electric construction services, as well as real estate administration; Synapsis took care of the information technologies and data processing area; while Diprel focused upon lending electric product supply and marketing services.

In the General Extraordinary Shareholder's Meeting of April 11, 2002, the corporate purpose of the company was modified, introducing the activities of telecommunications and the investment in and administration of companies having telecommunications and information technologies and business intermediation through the Internet as corporate purposes.

Acquisition by Enel (2014–present) 

In October 2014, after Endesa was acquired by Enel, Enersis S.A became controlled by Enel. The company underwent a corporate restructuring process that began in April 2015 and ended in December 2016. The restructuring consisted in separating the electric power generation and distribution activities developed in Chile, from the rest of the countries. In this way, Enel Americas S.A. was created, a company continuing Enersis with activities in Argentina, Brazil, Colombia and Peru, and Enel Chile S.A.

Today, Enel Americas S.A. is one of the largest private electric power companies in Latin America, in terms of consolidated assets and operational income, which has been achieved through a stable and balanced growth in its electric power businesses: generation, transmission and distribution.

The merger by absorption of the subsidiaries Emgesa S.A. ESP (Absorbing company), Codensa S.A. ESP, Enel Green Power  Colombia S.A.S. ESP y ESSA2 SpA (Absorbed companies) took place on March 1, 2022. The new corporate name of the merged company is Enel Colombia S.A. ESP, a company in which Enel Américas holds a 57.345% stake as a result of this operation.

Main milestones

Capital increase 
In April 2019, the Extraordinary Shareholders' Meeting approved a US$ 3 billion capital increase. The proceeds were used to conclude the purchase of AES Eletropaulo – the biggest distribution company of South America, with 7.2 million clients, in the city of São Paulo, Brazil – and to restructure Enel Brasil's pension fund liabilities related to the aforementioned purchase.

In September 2019, the capital increase was successfully concluded with a subscription of approximately 99.5% of the total shares.

Integration of non-conventional renewable energy business 
On December 18, 2020, the Company's Extraordinary Shareholders’ Meeting approved the Merger by incorporation of EGP Américas into Enel Américas by a large majority, allowing the latter to control and consolidate the ownership of the renewable energy business and generation assets that Enel Green Power develops and owns in Central and South America (except Chile).

Stock market information 
In Chile, the common stock is traded on the following stock exchanges: the Santiago Stock Exchange or "SSE" (Bolsa de Comercio de Santiago) and the Chilean Electronic Stock Exchange or "ESE" (Bolsa Electrónica de Chile). As of December 31, 2021, the SSE and ESE accounted for 97% and 3%, respectively, of the total equity traded in Chile. The market cap as of December 2021 was US$ 11.8 billion.

In the United States, the common stock trades on the NYSE (New York Stock Exchange), the primary market, in the form of ADSs. Each ADS represents 50 shares of common stock, with the ADS in turn evidenced by American Depositary Receipts (“ADRs”). As of December 31, 2021, ADRs evidencing 40,707,729 ADS (equivalent to 2,035,386,428 shares of common stock) were outstanding, representing 1.9% of the total number of outstanding shares. It is not practicable for us to determine the proportion of ADS beneficially owned by U.S. final beneficial holders. The trading volume of the shares on the NYSE and other U.S. exchanges in 2021 amounted to 384 million ADS, equivalent to approximately US$ 2,783 million.

In July 2019, Enel Américas celebrated 25 years of listing in the NYSE, closing the bell ceremony on July 31, 2019. The company voluntarily delisted from the NYSE in 2022.

Enel X 
In 2018, it formed Enel X Colombia S.A.S. (“Enel X Colombia”), a wholly-owned subsidiary of Codensa. The primary purpose of Enel X Colombia is to focus on public lighting tenders, supplementing the activities of Codensa. They also changed the name of Enel Soluçoes S.A., a wholly-owned subsidiary of Enel Brasil, to Enel X Brasil S.A. (“Enel X Brasil”). These companies will develop, implement, and sell products and services that incorporate innovation and cutting-edge technology and are different from selling energy or energy distribution and associated services. These Enel X companies expect to offer turnkey projects for municipalities and other public and governmental entities, industrial or residential customer appliances such as photovoltaic systems, heating ventilation air conditioning, led lighting, projects related to energy efficiency, and the development of public and private electric mobility, and charging infrastructure, in all cases including customers outside of the concession areas.

Sustainability in the core 
In February 2020 Enel Américas received the Bronze Class distinction for the work in sustainability and was incorporated - once again - into the Sustainability Yearbook. Since 2004, this has been the world's most comprehensive publication on corporate sustainability, while the Bronze Class Award is a distinction that is awarded to the best-performing companies in their industry and that fall into the ranking of between 5% and 10% of the best scores in SAM's Annual Corporate Sustainability Assessment (CSA).

The Company was the only electric utilities firm included in the new S&P Dow Jones sustainable index introduced by the Santiago Stock Exchange and S&P Dow Jones indices in January 2021. The S&P IPSA ESG Tilted Index follows rule-based selection criteria based on ESG principles (environmental, social and governance) to select and weight components from the IPSA S&P, to measure the performance of some of the largest and most liquid stocks listed on the Santiago Stock Exchange.

Electric power generation affiliates

Enel Américas has a total installed capacity of 15,965 MW as of December 31, 2021.

In Argentina, Enel Américas participates in electric power generation through Enel Generación, Enel Generación El Chocón and Central Dock Sud affiliates.

In Brazil, Enel Américas participates in electric power generation through Enel Brasil and its affiliates Cachoeira Dourada, Volta Grande and Enel Geração Fortaleza.

In Colombia, Enel Américas participates in electric power generation through its affiliate Enel Colombia.

In Perú, Enel Américas controls Enel Generación Peru and Enel Generación Piura through Enel Peru S.A.C.

Electric power distribution affiliates

Enel Américas participates in the electric power distribution business in Latin America through the following affiliates: 
 
 :  Edesur
 : Enel Distribución Rio, Enel Distribución Ceará, Enel Distribución Goiás and Enel Distribución São Paulo
 : Enel Colombia
 : Enel Distribución Perú

Electric power transmission affiliates

Enel Américas participates in the electric power transmission business through the interconnecting line between Argentina and Brazil. This takes place through Enel Cien, an affiliate of Enel Brasil.

References

Electric power companies of Chile
Information technology companies of Chile
Enel
Companies based in Santiago
Energy companies established in 1889
1889 establishments in Chile
Holding companies established in 1988
Non-renewable resource companies established in 1988
1988 establishments in Chile
Companies listed on the Santiago Stock Exchange
Companies listed on the Madrid Stock Exchange
Companies formerly listed on the New York Stock Exchange